The following is the final results of the Iranian Volleyball Super League (Unity Cup) 2009/10 season.

Regular season

Standings

Results

Playoffs

Bottom 7

Top 8

Quarterfinals
Paykan vs. Bank Keshavarzi

Kalleh vs. Petrochimi

Saipa vs. Bargh Kerman

Damash vs. Javaheri Gonbad

Semifinals
Paykan vs. Kalleh

Saipa vs. Damash

3rd place
Damash vs. Kalleh

Final
Paykan vs. Saipa

Final standings

References
volleyball.ir 
www.radiovarzesh.ir

League 2009-10
Iran Super League, 2009-10
Iran Super League, 2009-10
Volleyball League, 2009-10
Volleyball League, 2009-10